Stephanostema is a genus of flowering plants in the family Apocynaceae, first described as a genus in 1904. It contains only one known species, Stephanostema stenocarpum, found only in the Uzaramo District in eastern Tanzania.

References

Flora of Tanzania
Monotypic Apocynaceae genera
Wrightieae